Baalsrud is a Norwegian surname. Notable people with the surname include:

Andreas Baalsrud (1872–1961), Norwegian civil engineer
Jan Baalsrud (1917–1988), Norwegian Army commando
Terje Baalsrud (1914–2003), Norwegian newspaper editor

Norwegian-language surnames